Chari is one of 3 departments making up the region of Chari-Baguirmi in Chad. Its capital is Mandélia.

sub-prefectures 
Chari  is divided into four sub-prefectures:

Mandélia 
La Loumia 
Koundoul 
Linia 
Lougoun (Logone Gana)

References 

Departments of Chad
Chari-Baguirmi Region